Mankki railway station was a station on the VR commuter rail network located in Espoo, Finland, between the stations of Kauklahti and Luoma. The station had two tracks, with track one serving trains towards Kirkkonummi and the other towards Helsinki. The platform in the direction of Helsinki is a very rare wooden platform. Mankki was the least used station in the Espoo area, with only 60-100 passengers per day before its closure. Because of the very low number of passengers, the station was closed on 27th of March 2016.

Connections
Only the U and early morning/late night L trains between Kirkkonummi and Helsinki stopped at Mankki giving approximately an hourly service, but the faster S trains did not stop. The regional Y trains between Karis and Helsinki also passed through the station without stopping.

References

External links

Railway stations in Espoo
Railway stations closed in 2016
Defunct railway stations in Finland